Dr David Stark Murray (14 July 1900 – 16 September 1977), son of Robert Murray MP was a consultant  pathologist, writer, and president of the Socialist Medical Association 1951–70.  He was active in campaigning for the establishment of the British National Health Service.

He was born at 244 Main Street, Barrhead, Scotland, and qualified in 1925 from Glasgow University. He came to London in 1927 as pathologist to the Lambeth Hospital under the Board of Guardians. He lived at 33 Murray Road, Northwood, London. Then followed appointments as Consulting Pathologist to the Royal Hospital Richmond and other hospitals in the area, Group Pathologist in the Emergency Medical Service (1939) at Kingston, Surrey and from 1948, under the NHS, Group Pathologist, Kingston Hospital until his retirement in 1965.  He established laboratories at Richmond and Kingston and the central sterile supplies department at Kingston Hospital.  He was Chairman of the Blood Transfusion Service of the South West Metropolitan Region of the NHS.  He was president of the Surrey Branch of the British Medical Association.

In October 1962 he went to the University of Chicago to talk to students about the fight for socialized medicine.

For many years he edited the Socialist Doctor, Medicine Today and Tomorrow, and Socialism and Health. He wrote innumerable articles on the health service under his own name and under pseudonyms, specially that of Irwin Brown.

Publications
 The Laboratory: its Place in the Modern World 1934
 Science Fights Death 1936
 Your Body: How it is Built and How it Works, London, Watts & Co., 1936
 Health for all V. Gollancz, 1942.
 The Future Of Medicine Penguin 1942
 Your Health, Mr. Smith 1946
 Now for Health with L. C. J. McNae St Botolph Publishing 1946
 The anatomy of man and other animals, or, brothers under the skin 1951
 Medical Care and Family Security (with Karl Evang, and Walter Jay Lear) Prentice-Hall, 1963
 India—which Century? Gollancz, 1967
 Why a National Health Service? Pemberton Books 1971
Medical Care: Who gets the best service? Fabian Society 1971
 Blueprint for Health Schocken Books, 1974
 Health for 1000 Million People: Health Care Today in China and Russia  (with Joan Sohn-Rethel)  Socialist Medical Association 1977

References

External links
 Obituary
 Oxford Dictionary of National Biography
 The Right to be Healthy Chicago DSA Audio Archive 1972
 98% satisfied Dr. Stark Murray; interviewed by Elsa Knight Thompson Pacifica Radio Archive 1962

1900 births
1977 deaths
Scottish activists
English pathologists
National Health Service people
20th-century English medical doctors
English health activists